Below a list of all National champions in the Men's Marathon in track and field from several countries since 1980.

Argentina

1980: Alfredo Maravilla
1981: Raúl Omar Suárez
1982: Alfredo Maravilla
1983: Carlos José Orué
1984: Rubén Aguiar
1985: Carlos José Orué
1986: Juan Carlos Ríos
1987: Rubén Aguiar
1988: Toribio Gutiérrez
1989: Toribio Gutiérrez
1990: Carlos Edgar Barria
1991: Carlos Edgar Barria
1992: Toribio Gutiérrez
1993: Tranquilino Valenzuela
1994: Toribio Gutiérrez
1995: Carlos Edgar Barria
1996: Juan Pablo Juárez
1997: Toribio Gutiérrez
1998: Oscar Alarcón
1999: Oscar Cortínez
2000: Juan Castro
2001: Claudio Burgos
2002: Alejandro Giménez
2003: Daniel Simbrón
2004: Daniel Simbrón
2005: Oscar Cortínez
2006: Oscar Cortínez
2007: Oscar Cortínez

Australia

1980: Lawrence Whitty
1981: Garry Bentley
1982: Robert Wallace
1983: John Stanley
1984: Andrew Lloyd
1985: Grenville Wood
1986: Stephen Austin
1987: Daniel Boltz
1988: Patrick Carroll
1989: Bradley Camp
1990: Allan Carman
1991: Sean Quilty
1992: Gerard Barrett
1993: Sean Quilty
1994: Michael Dalton
1995: Roderic deHighden
1996: Magnus Michelsson
1997: Patrick Carroll
1998: Greg Lyons
1999: Shaun Creighton
2000: Roderic deHighden
2001: Borislav Devic
2002: Jeremy Horne
2003: Paul Arthur
2004: Daniel Green
2005: Brett Cartwright
2006: Lee Troop

Canada

1980: Brian Maxwell
1981: John Hill
1982: Michael Dyon
1983: Art Boileau
1984: Dave Edge
1985: Roger Schwegel
1986: Agustin Diaz Romero
1987: Michael Dyon
1988: Gordon Christie
1989: Peter Maher
1990: Ashley Dustow
1991: Michael Petrocci
1992-1999: Not Held
2000: Bruce Deacon
2001: Bruce Deacon
2002: Bruce Deacon
2003: Not Held
2004: Matthew McInnes
2005: James Finlayson
2006: Charles Bedley
2007: Matthew McInnes
2008: Giitah Macharia
2009: Reid Coolsaet
2010: Stephen Drew
2011: Lucas McAneney
2012: Rejean Chiasson

England

1980: Ian Thompson
1981: Hugh Jones
1982: Steve Kenyon
1983: Mike Gratton
1984: Charlie Spedding
1985: Steve Jones (WAL)
1986: Hugh Jones
1987: Hugh Jones
1988: Kevin Forster
1989: Tony Milovsorov
1990: Allister Hutton (SCO)
1991: Dave Long
1992: Paul Evans
1993: Eamonn Martin
1994: Eamonn Martin
1995: Paul Evans
1996: Paul Evans
1997: Paul Evans
1998: Mark Hudspith
1999: Mark Hudspith
2000: Mark Hudspith
2001: Mark Steinle
2002: Mark Steinle
2003: Christopher Cariss
2004: Jonathan Brown
2005: Jonathan Brown
2006: Peter Riley
2007: Dan Robinson

Denmark

1980: Jørn Lauenborg
1981: Svend-Erik Kristensen
1982: Jørn Lauenborg
1983: John Skovbjerg
1984: Keld Johnsen
1985: Christian Wolfsberg
1986: Svend-Erik Kristensen
1987: Palle Redder Madsen
1988: Jens Wørzner
1989: Peter Nordsmark
1990: Svend-Erik Kristensen
1991: Svend-Erik Kristensen
1992: Helge Gommesen
1993: Niels Kristian Vejen
1994: Palle Redder Madsen
1995: Kent Jensen
1996: Palle Redder Madsen
1997: Søren Rasmussen
1998: Christian Wolfsberg
1999: Torben Juul Nielsen
2000: Torben Juul Nielsen
2001: Torben Juul Nielsen
2002: Torben Juul Nielsen
2003: Jørgen Gamborg
2004: Torben Juul Nielsen
2005: Søren Palshøj
2006: Torben Juul Nielsen
2007: Søren Palshøj

Estonia
Estonian national champions are as follows.

1927: Elmar Reiman
1928: Karl Laas
1929: Karl Laas
1930: Karl Laas
1931–1933: –
1934: Alfred Maasik
1935: Otto Treimann
1936: August Koidu
1937–1938: –
1939: Bernhard Lont
1940: Bernhard Lont
1941–1946: –
1947: Loit Laidna
1948: Aleksander Külm
1949: Richard Lulla
1950: Viktor Puusepp
1951: Nikolai Kanajev
1952: Arnold Vaabla
1953: Viktor Puusepp
1954: Viktor Puusepp
1955: Viktor Puusepp
1956: Viktor Puusepp
1957: Viktor Puusepp
1958: Arkaadi Birkenfeldt
1959: Rein Leinus
1960: Rein Leinus
1961: Rein Leinus
1962: Rein Leinus
1963: Rein Leinus
1964: Ronald Suur
1965: Ronald Suur
1966: Ronald Suur
1967: Rein Leinus
1968: Rein Leinus
1969: Rein Leinus
1970: Rein Leinus
1971: Mart Kalder
1972: Jüri Liim
1973: Mati Kartau
1974: Küllo Tiido
1975: Toivo Koovit
1976: Küllo Tiido
1977: Toivo Koovit
1978: Aare Kuum
1979: Avo Järv
1980: Aare Kuum
1981: Rene Meimer
1982: Vladimir Heerik
1983: Villy Sudemäe
1984: Villy Sudemäe
1985: Villy Sudemäe
1986: Kalev Urbanik
1987: Meelis Veilberg
1988: Rein Valdmaa
1989: Kaupo Sabre
1990: Kaupo Sabre
1991: Kaupo Sabre
1992: Vello Misler
1993: Rein Valdmaa
1994: Henno Haava
1995: Vladimir Arhipov
1996: Kaupo Sabre
1997: Margus Pirksaar
1998: Toomas Tarm
1999: Kaupo Sabre
2000: Vladimir Bõtšuk
2001: Kaupo Sabre
2002: Toomas Tarm
2003: Toomas Tarm
2004: Toomas Tarm
2005: Margus Lehtna
2006: Taavi Tambur
2007: Aleksei Saveljev
2008: Aleksei Markov
2009: Aleksei Markov
2010: Pavel Loskutov
2011: Kaupo Sasmin
2012: Viljar Vallimäe
2013: Roman Fosti
2014: Heinar Vaine
2015: Sergei Tšerepannikov
2016: Heinar Vaine
2017: Argo Jõesoo
2018: Roman Fosti
2019: Raido Mitt
2020: Rauno Jallai
2021: Dmitri Aristov

Finland

1980: Esa Tikkanen
1981: Pertti Tiainen
1982: Niilo Kemppe
1983: Ulf-Hakan Spik
1984: Esa Liedes
1985: Vesa Kähkölä
1986: Jouni Kortelainen
1987: Asko Uusimäki
1988: Vesa Kähkölä
1989: Pekka Vähä-Vahe
1990: Illka Väänänen
1991: Pekka Vähä-Vahe
1992: Yrjö Pesonen
1993: Yrjö Pesonen
1994: Yrjö Pesonen
1995: Jussi Huttunen
1996: Jari Jaakkola
1997: Ville Hautala
1998: Lauri Friari
1999: Lauri Friari
2000: Yrjö Pesonen
2001: Jaakko Kero
2002: Yrjö Pesonen
2003: Yrjö Pesonen
2004: Petri Saavalainen
2005: Petri Saavalainen
2006: Yrjö Pesonen
2007: Marko Vaittinen
2008: Anssi Raittila
2009: Lewis Korir
2010: Obed Kipkurui
2011: Jaakko Kero

France

1980: Bernard Bobes
1981: Dominique Chauvelier
1982: Bernard Faure
1983: Alain Lazare
1984: Patrick Joannes
1985: Patrick Joannes
1986: Alain Lazare
1987: Jean-Jacques Padel
1988: Alexandre Rachide
1989: Thierry Watrice
1990: Dominique Chauvelier
1991: Dominique Chauvelier
1992: Louis Soares
1993: Dominique Chauvelier
1994: Philippe Remond
1995: Abdi Djama
1996: Pascal Fétizon
1997: Pascal Blanchard
1998: Bertrand Itsweire
1999: Abdelhakim Bagy
2000: Benoît Zwierzchiewski
2001: Philippe Remond
2002: Samir Baala
2003: Not Held
2004: David Antoine
2005: David Antoine
2006: Pascal Fétizon
2007: David Antoine
2008: Samir Baala

Germany

East Germany

1980: Martin Schröder
1981: Matthias Böckler
1982: Waldemar Cierpinski
1983: Stephan Seidemann
1984: Frank Konzack
1985: Jörg Peter
1986: Uwe Koch
1987: Michael Heilmann
1988: Rainer Wachenbrunner
1989: Steffen Dittmann
1990: Klaus Goldammer

West Germany

1968: Hubert Riesner
1969: Hubert Riesner
1970: Hans Hellbach
1971: Lutz Philipp
1972: Lutz Philipp
1973: Lutz Philipp
1974: Anton Gorbunow
1975: Günter Mielke
1976: Paul Angenvoorth
1977: Günter Mielke
1978: Reinhard Leibold
1979: Michael Spöttel
1980: Ralf Salzmann
1981: Ralf Salzmann
1982: Ralf Salzmann
1983: Ralf Salzmann
1984: Ralf Salzmann
1985: Herbert Steffny
1986: Wolfgang Krüger
1987: Guido Dold
1988: Udo Reeh
1989: Uwe Hartmann
1990: Josef Oefele

Unified Germany

1991: Thomas Ertl
1992: Thomas Ertl
1993: Kurt Stenzel
1994: Stephan Freigang
1995: Konrad Dobler
1996: Steffen Dittmann
1997: Dirk Nürnberger
1998: Stephan Freigang
1999: Carsten Eich
2000: Matthias Körner
2001: Michael Fietz
2002: Martin Beckmann
2003: Michael Fietz
2004: Stephan Freigang
2005: Dirk Nürnberger
2006: Matthias Körner
2007: Philipp Büttner
2008: Martin Beckmann
2009: Stefan Koch
2010: Dennis Pyka
2011: Stefan Koch
2012: Jan Simon Hamann
2013: Frank Schauer
2014: Tobias Schreindl

Italy

1908: Umberto Blasi
1909: Umberto Blasi (2)
1910: Antonio Fraschini
1911: Orlando Cesaroni
1912: Giovanni Beltrandi
1913: Fernando Altimani (4)
1914: Angelo Malvicini
1915-1918: not held
1919: Valerio Arri
1920: Florestano Benedetti
1921: Florestano Benedetti (2)
1922: Angelo Malvicini (2)
1923: Ettore Blasi
1924: Romeo Bertini
1925: Attilio Conton
1926: Stefano Natale
1927: Luigi Rossini
1928: Luigi Prato
1929: Stefano Natale (2)
1930: Stefano Natale (3)
1931: Francesco Roccati
1932: Michele Fanelli
1933: Aurelio Genghini
1934: Michele Fanelli (2)
1935: Luigi Rossini (2)
1936: Giovanni Balzone
1937: Aurelio Genghini (2)
1938: Francesco Raccati
1939: Francesco Raccati (2)
1940: Salvatore Costantino
1941: Romano Maffeis
1942: Francesco Raccati (3)
1943-1944: not held
1945: Ettore Padovani
1946: Stefano Natale (4)
1947: Salvatore Costantino (2)
1948: Renato Braghini
1949: Cristofano Sestini
1950: Gaetano Marzano
1951: Asfò Bussotti
1952: Egilberto Martufi
1953: Antonio Sabelli 
1954: Antidoro Berti
1955: Antidoro Berti (2)
1956: Rino Lavelli
1957: Rino Lavelli (2)
1958: Francesco Perrone
1959: Enrico Massante
1960: Rino Lavelli
1961: Francesco Perrone (2)
1962: Antonio Ambu
1963: Giorgio Jegmer
1964: Antonio Ambu (2)
1965: Antonio Ambu (3)
1966: Antonio Ambu (4)
1967: Antonio Ambu (5)
1968: Antonio Ambu (6)
1969: Antonio Ambu (7)
1970: Toni Ritsch
1971: Giovanbattista Bassi
1972: Francesco Amante
1973: Paolo Accaputo
1974: Giuseppe Cindolo
1975: Giuseppe Cindolo (2)
1976: Giuseppe Cindolo (3)
1977: Paolo Accaputo (2)
1978: Massimo Magnani
1979: Michelangelo Arena
1980: Michelangelo Arena (2)
1981: Giampaolo Messina
1982: Giuseppe Gerbi
1983: Giuseppe Gerbi (2)
1984: Gianni Poli
1985: Osvaldo Faustini
1986: Osvaldo Faustini (2)
1987: Salvatore Bettiol
1988: Carlo Terzer
1989: Marco Milani
1990: Severino Bernardini
1991: Salvatore Bettiol (2)
1992: Giacomo Tagliaferri
1993: Walter D'Urbano
1994: Salvatore Nicosia
1995: Danilo Goffi
1996: Franco Togni
1997: Massimiliano Ingrami
1998: Migidio Bourifa
1999: Roberto Barbi
2000: Roberto Barbi (2)
2001: Angelo Carosi
2002: Fabio Rinaldi
2003: Angelo Carosi (2)
2004: Roberto Barbi (3)
2005: Vincenzo Modica
2006: Ruggero Pertile
2007: Migidio Bourifa (2)
2008: Alberico Di Cecco
2009: Migidio Bourifa (3)
2010: Migidio Bourifa (4)
2011: Giovanni Gualdi
2012: Migidio Bourifa (5)
2013: Ruggero Pertile (2)

Japan

1980: Hiroshi Yuge
1981: Robert de Castella (AUS)
1982: Michio Mizukubo
1983: Toshihiko Seko
1984: Tetsuji Iwase
1985: Hisatoshi Shintaku
1986: Toshihiro Shibutani
1987: Takeyuki Nakayama
1988: Toshihiko Seko
1989: Manuel Matias (POR)
1990: Eddy Hellebuyck (BEL)
1991: Shuichi Morita
1992: Michael O'Reilly (ENG)
1993: Dionicio Cerón (MEX)
1994: Kenichi Suzuki
1995: Masaki Oya
1996: Hiroshi Tako
1997: Toshiyuki Hayata
1998: Muneyuki Ojima
1999: Hiroshi Miki
2000: Atsushi Fujita
2001: Shigeru Aburaya
2002: Toshio Mano
2003: Tomoaki Kunichika
2004: Tadayuki Ojima
2005: Toshinari Takaoka
2006: Wataru Okutani
2007: Mitsuru Kubota
2008: Arata Fujiwara

Netherlands

1980: Rudi Verriet
1981: Cor Vriend
1982: Cor Vriend
1983: Cor Vriend
1984: Gerard Nijboer
1985: Cor Vriend
1986: Adri Hartveld
1987: Marti ten Kate
1988: Gerard Nijboer
1989: Huub Pragt
1990: Jan van Rijthoven
1991: Bert van Vlaanderen
1992: Bert van Vlaanderen
1993: Bert van Vlaanderen
1994: Aart Stigter
1995: Bert van Vlaanderen
1996: Aiduna Aitnafa
1997: Luc Krotwaar
1998: Luc Krotwaar
1999: Luc Krotwaar
2000: Luc Krotwaar
2001: Peter van Egdom
2002: Luc Krotwaar
2003: Kamiel Maase
2004: Luc Krotwaar
2005: Kamiel Maase
2006: Kamiel Maase
2007: Luc Krotwaar
2008: Greg van Hest
2009: Koen Raymaekers
2010: Koen Raymaekers
2011: Michel Butter
2012: Patrick Stitzinger
2013: Patrick Stitzinger
2014: Paul Zwama
2015: Abdi Nageeye
2016: Khalid Choukoud

New Zealand

1980: Don Greig
1981: Paul Ballinger
1982: Trevor Wright
1983: Graham Macky
1984: Barry Thompson
1985: John Campbell
1986: John Campbell
1987: Peter Renner
1988: Paul Ballinger
1989: Paul Ballinger
1990: Tom Birnie
1991: Paul Herlihy
1992: Mark Hutchinson
1993: Paul Herlihy
1994: Paul Smith
1995: Chris Mardon
1996: Phil Costley
1997: Peter Buske
1998: Mark Hutchinson
1999: Phil Costley
2000: Mark Hutchinson
2001: Alastair Snowdon
2002: Mark Bright
2003: Todd Stevens
2004: Dale Warrander
2005: Matt Dravitski
2006: Dale Warrander

Poland

1970: Zdzisław Bogusz
1971: Edward Stawiarz
1972: Edward Stawiarz
1973: Edward Stawiarz
1974: Edward Łęgowski
1975: Edward Łęgowski
1976: Kazimierz Orzeł
1977: Kazimierz Orzeł
1978: Ryszard Marczak
1979: Zbigniew Pierzynka
1980: Zbigniew Pierzynka
1981: Ryszard Marczak
1982: Ryszard Kopijasz
1983: Jerzy Kowol
1984: Wojciech Ratkowski
1985: Ryszard Misiewicz
1986: Antoni Niemczak
1987: Bogumił Kuś
1988: Wiktor Sawicki
1989: Marek Deputat
1990: Józef Kazanecki
1991: Tadeusz Ławicki
1992: Tadeusz Ławicki
1993: Tadeusz Ławicki
1994: Janusz Wójcik
1995: Wiesław Pałczyński
1996: Mirosław Plawgo
1997: Adam Szanowicz
1998: Wiesław Perszke
1999: Piotr Pobłocki
2000: Mirosław Plawgo
2001: Mirosław Plawgo
2002: Jan Białk
2003: Waldemar Glinka
2004: Waldemar Glinka
2005: Rafał Wójcik
2006: Rafał Wójcik
2007: Paweł Ochal
2008: Henryk Szost
2009: Radosław Dudycz
2010: Radosław Dudycz
2011: Błażej Brzeziński
2012: Yared Shegumo
2013: Arkadiusz Gardzielewski
2014: Henryk Szost
2015: Henryk Szost
2016: Artur Kozłowski

Portugal

1980: Armando Aldegalega
1981: Delfim Moreira
1982: Renato Graça
1983: Cidálio Caetano
1984: Manuel Oliveira
1985: Artur Borba Oliveira
1986: Telmo Fernandes
1987: João A. Campos
1988: Telmo Fernandes
1989: António Costa
1990: António Godinho
1991: Mário Sousa
1992: Gilberto Fernandes
1993: Domingos Neves
1994: Galhardo Pires
1995: João Lopes
1996: Manuel Pita
1997: Domingos Neves
1998: Alcídio Costa
1999: Eusébio Costa
2000: António Sousa
2001: Carlos Valente
2002: Vítor Cordeiro
2003: Luís Jesus
2004: Eusébio Rosa
2005: João Marques
2006: Luís Jesus
2007: José Oliveira
2008: Rui Coimbra
2009: Vasco Azevedo
2010: -
2011: Vasco Azevedo

Russia

1992: Ruslan Yamayev
1993: Andrey Tarasov
1994: Anatoliy Archakov
1995: Vladimir Plykin
1996: Aleksandr Gurin
1997: Vladimir Epanov
1998: Andrey Shalagin
1999: Oleg Strizhakov
2000: Aleksey Korobov
2001: Mikhail Romanov
2002: Yuriy Chizhov
2003: Aleksey Sokolov
2004: Dmitriy Burmakin
2005: Aleksey Sokolov
2006: Andrey Chernyshov
2007: Aleksey Sokolov

Spain 
Spanish national champions are as follows.

1980: Eleuterio Antón
1981: Eleuterio Antón
1982: Santiago de la Parte
1983: Juan Carlos Traspaderne
1984: Eleuterio Antón
1985: Alfonso Abellán
1986: Santiago de la Parte
1987: Vicente Anton
1988: Alfonso Abellan
1989: Emiliano García
1990: Vicente Anton
1991: Jesus de Grado
1992: Rodrigo Gavela
1993: Ricardo Jose Castaño
1994: Jose Apalanza
1995: Ricardo Jose Castaño
1996: Rodrigo Gavela
1997: Antoni Peña
1998: Juan Antonio Ruiz
1999: José María Gonzales
2000: Benito Ojeda
2001: Benito Ojeda
2002-2004: Not Held
2005: Roger Roca
2006: Javier Díaz
2007: Oskar Martin
2008: Asier Cuevas
2009: Rafael Iglesias
2010: Miguel Angel Gamonal
2011: Pablo Villalobos
2012: Carles Castillejo
2013: Javi Guerra
2014: Carles Castillejo
2015: Pedro Nimo
2016: Carles Castillejo
2017: Pablo Villalobos
2018: Javi Guerra

Ukraine 

1992: ???
1993: ???
1994: Pavlo Vasylenko
1995: ???
1996: ???
1997: ???
1998: ???
1999: ???
2000: ???
2001: ???
2002: ???
2003: Oleksandr Holovnytskyi
2004: Serhiy Kryzhko
2005: Viktor Rogovyi
2006: Andriy Goliney
2007: ???
2008: Oleksiy Rybalchenko
2009: Oleksiy Rybalchenko
2010: Vasyl Remshchuk
2011: Oleksandr Sitkovskyy
2012: Ihor Olefirenko
2013: Ihor Olefirenko
2014: Roman Romanenko
2015: Ihor Olefirenko
2016: Serhiy Marchuk
2017: Artem Piddubnyi
2018: Mykola Yukhymchuk
2019: Bohdan-Ivan Horodyskyi
2020: not held

United States

1980: Frank Richardson
1981: Robert Johnson
1982: Joel Menges
1983: Peter Pfitzinger
1984: Ken Martin
1985: Ken Martin
1986: William Donakowski
1987: Ric Sayre
1988: Mark Conover
1989: Bill Reifsnyder
1990: Steve Spence
1991: Bill Reifsnyder
1992: Steve Spence
1993: Ed Eyestone
1994: Paul Pilkington
1995: Keith Brantly
1996: Bob Kempainen
1997: Dave Scudamore
1998: Keith Brantly
1999: Alfredo Vigueras
2000: Rod DeHaven
2001: Scott Larson
2002: Dan Browne
2003: Ryan Shay
2004: Alan Culpepper
2005: Mbarak Hussein
2006: Mbarak Hussein
2007: Ryan Hall
2008: Fernando Cabada
2009: Meb Keflezighi
2010: Sergio Reyes

References

External sources
 Athletics Canada
 GBRathletics
 ARRS site
 Australian Championships

Men
National
Marathon